Admira Wacker is an Austrian football club which is based in Maria Enzersdorf. During the 2015–16 campaign they will be competing in the following competitions: Austrian Bundesliga, Austrian Cup.

Pre Season

Competitions

Austrian Bundesliga

Austrian Cup

References

FC Admira Wacker Mödling seasons
Austrian football clubs 2015–16 season